Filadelfio Caroniti (2 January 1906, San Fratello - 12 September 1979) was an Italian politician. He represented the Christian Democracy in the Chamber of Deputies from 1948 to 1953.

References

1906 births
1979 deaths
People from San Fratello
Christian Democracy (Italy) politicians
Deputies of Legislature I of Italy
Politicians from the Province of Messina